Yanbian Beiguo Football Club is an amateur Chinese football club that currently participates in the China League Two. The team was based in Hunchun and it used 18,000-capacity Hunchun People's Stadium of Hunchun as their home stadium.

On February 4, 2020, Yanbian Beiguo was disqualified for 2020 China League Two due to its failure to hand in the salary and bonus confirmation form before the deadline.

Managerial history
  Huang Yong (2017)
  Wang Sun-jae (2018)
  Choi Jin-han (2018)
  Nebojša Maksimović (2019)
  Jin Qing (2019)

Results
All-time league rankings

As of the end of 2019 season.

 In group stage.

Key
 Pld = Played
 W = Games won
 D = Games drawn
 L = Games lost
 F = Goals for
 A = Goals against
 Pts = Points
 Pos = Final position

 DNQ = Did Not Qualify
 DNE = Did Not Enter
 NH = Not Held
 WD = Withdrawal
 – = Does Not Exist
 R1 = Round 1
 R2 = Round 2
 R3 = Round 3
 R4 = Round 4

 F = Final
 SF = Semi-finals
 QF = Quarter-finals
 R16 = Round of 16
 Group = Group stage
 GS2 = Second Group stage
 QR1 = First Qualifying Round
 QR2 = Second Qualifying Round
 QR3 = Third Qualifying Round

References

Football clubs in China
Defunct football clubs in China
Association football clubs established in 2016
2016 establishments in China
2020 disestablishments in China
Association football clubs disestablished in 2020